Becca's Bunch is a preschool television series featuring handmade puppet characters that premiered in the United Kingdom and Ireland on Nick Jr. on 2 July 2018 and ended on 13 December 2018. The series premiered in the United States on Nick Jr. on 24 September 2018.

Characters

Main
 Becca (voiced by Noa Fe Williams) is an optimistic bird  who wears a red knit cap. She is the leader of her bunch and the protagonist of the series. Her musical instrument is a guitar.
 Russell (voiced by Dylan Martin Frankel) is an adventurous squirrel. His musical instrument is drums
 Pedro (voiced by Ben Stone Zelman) is a fearful bespectacled worm. His musical instrument is a tambourine.
 Sylvia (voiced by Susie Power) is a clever pink fox. She carries a shoulder bag containing objects which her friends would sometimes use in their adventures. Her musical instrument is a keyboard.

Recurring
 Benny and Shelly (both voiced by Lisa Biggs) are Becca's baby brother and sister. They are still in their eggs, though their limbs are sticking out, and are able to walk.
Moms (voiced by Amy Stephenson) is Becca's mother. She is sometimes see flying an airplane.
Pops (voiced by Grant George) is Becca's father.
Uncle Ned (voiced by William Gaminara) is Pedro's uncle.
Ringo (voiced by Guy Harris) is a turtle who is a bus driver.
Mayor Ladymaus (voiced by Amy Palant) a opossum is the mayor of Wagtail Woods.
Barry (voiced by Daxx George) is a little bunny.
Lola (voiced by Lisa Biggs) a rabbit who is Barry's mother.
Casper and Jasper (both voiced by Jaden Pace) are the hare brothers, and are somewhat rivals of the bunch.
Beatrice (voiced by Sabrina Glow) is a young badger, who is a friend of Casper and Jasper.
Gill (voiced by Jason Shablik) is a big fish.
Steven Se'Gull (voiced by Paul Tylak) is a seagull, he's the lifeguard of the beach.
John Wolfenstein (voiced by Paul Tylak) is a gray wolf, who is a radio personality of Wagtail Woods.
Mr. Nugget (voiced by Paul Tylak) is a chicken, who's John Wolfenstein's best friend and colleague. Unlike the other characters, he does not speak but just clucks.
MJ (voiced by Joey Camen) is a big moose.
Buck (voiced by Joey Camen) is a building beaver.

Production and broadcast 
The series is a production of JAM Media. In June 2018, it was announced that Becca's Bunch would premiere in the United Kingdom and Ireland on Nick Jr. on 2 July 2018. On 19 September 2018, it was announced that the series will premiere in the United States on Nick Jr. on 24 September 2018. The series was also sold for broadcast on ABC Kids in Australia, KiKa in Germany, CBC Kids in Canada and France Télévisions. Becca's Bunch consists of 52 eleven-minute segments.

Episodes

Awards and nominations

References

External links 
  on Nick Jr.

2010s British children's television series
2018 British television series debuts
2018 British television series endings
2010s preschool education television series
British preschool education television series
British television shows featuring puppetry
Television series about birds
English-language television shows